Awad Saud Awad is Palestinian writer and journalist, he has 15 published books, 3 novels and 10 stories books and 2 studies books about the Palestinian folklore.

Life 
Awad Saud Awad was born in 1943  in Job Josef – Safad in Mandatory Palestine. His parents left their home to Syria in 1948 because of the 1948 war. He lived in Khan Al-Shih camp which the UNRWA take the responsibility about it. He got the bachelor of Arts – History -from Damascus University in 1971. In 1970 he married a Lebanese Palestinian woman, Mariam Al-Hamed. They lived their first three years in Khan Al-Shih camp until the war of 1973, they left the camp and lived about six years in Joubar and then moved to Zamalka near Damascus, they have two boys and three girls. He worked as a teacher in the United Nations Relief and Works Agency for Palestine Refugees (UNRWA) in Damascus – Syria from 1968 to 1996, where he obliged to resign from his work because of the bad treatment from the administration of UNRWA in Syria.

Career

In field of story and novel 
He started writing in the 1970s and he published his first stories book for children A Journey to Andromeda Galaxy, in 1981. Since 1981 he became a member of Palestinian Writers and Journalists Union in Damascus – Syria. He became a member of Arab Writers Union – Damascus- Syria, in 1989. he was the president of the Association of the story and the novel in the Arab Writers Union – Damascus, Syria during the years 2005 to 2006 and 2009 to 2010. He delegated by the Arab Writers Union to visit Turkey to provide a study on the history of Story at Syria in June 2008.

In the field of folklore and heritage 
He participated actively in the establishment of celebrations for the Palestinian folklore week which was conducted annually in Damascus-Syrian during the 80th of the last century and he was the supervisor of the Palestinian Folklore Heritage artistic bands from 1988 to 1994. He founded the Palestinian Folklore Heritage Center in Damascus- Syria and he was the director of this center during 1991–1996.

Awad Saud Awad is one of the important novelists in Palestine and in Syria, and he is one of the most important Arabic critics of the novel and the story in the modern era. His critical studies which published in Arabic newspapers and magazines, are more than 200 critical studies of Arab writers from different nationalities. Moreover, he has many heritage publications in specialized periodical magazines. He conducted lectures in various Syrian provinces about the Story and Folklore.

Publications

Novel 
The Midway Strangers, Awad S. Awad, Publisher: the Arab Writers Union, Damascus – 2006.
The Blooming of Qandoul, Awad S. Awad, Publisher: the Arab Writers Union, Damascus 1997.
The Farewell, Awad S. Awad, Publisher: the Arab Writers Union, Damascus 1987.

Studies 
Palestinian Folklore Expressions, Publisher: Dar Kanaan, Damascus 1993. 
Studies in Palestinian Folklore, Publisher: Department of Media and Education, Damascus 1983.

Story 
Labyrinth of Love, Awad S. Awad, issued by the Ministry of Culture, Damascus 2019.
A Nap of Ash, Awad S. Awad, Publisher: the Arab Writers Union, Damascus 2011.
Henna Travel, Awad S. Awad, Publisher: the Arab Writers Union, Damascus 2009.
Flood of Night, Awad S. Awad, Publisher:  the Arab Writers Union, Damascus 2005.
Postponed Joys, Awad S. Awad, issued by the Ministry of Culture, Damascus 2004.
Lightings on the Wall of memory, Awad S. Awad, Publisher: the Arab Writers Union, Damascus 2002.
The waiting, Awad S. Awad, Publisher: the Arab Writers Union, Damascus 1994.
The Liberty Ship (for children), Awad S. Awad, Publisher: Dar el-Sheikh, Damascus 1988.
Palm and Banana Tree (for children), Awad S. Awad, Damascus 1983.
A Journey to Andromeda Galaxy (for children), Awad S. Awad, Damascus 1981.

References 

1943 births
Living people
Anti-Zionism
Palestinian literary critics
Palestinian activists
UNRWA officials
Palestinians in Syria
Palestinian refugees
Palestinian agnostics
Palestinian children's writers
Palestinian novelists
Palestinian journalists
Palestinian short story writers
Palestinian officials of the United Nations